The Ebro Delta is the delta region of the Ebro River in the southwest of the Province of Tarragona in the region of Catalonia in Spain. It is located on the Mediterranean Sea, and is the northernmost point, by some designations, of the Gulf of Valencia.

Geography

The Ebro delta has expanded rapidly on soils washed downriver. The town of Amposta, a seaport in the 4th century, demonstrates the historical rate of growth of the delta as it is now located well inland from the current river mouth. The rounded form of the delta attests to the balance between sediment deposition by the Ebro and removal of this material by wave erosion.

The area at the primary mouth of the Ebro is currently protected by several fluvial islands: the Isle of Garxal, the Isle of Sant Antoni, and the Isle of Buddha.

Uses

Agriculture
Some delta areas have been drained for agricultural use over the centuries.  The modern delta is in intensive agricultural use for rice, fruit (in particular citrus), and vegetables. The Rice-producing Cooperative of the Ebro Delta accounts for a production capacity of 45 thousand tonnes of rice annually, from 14 varietals, cultivated on 22,000 hectares. Compared to the major Spanish rice-producing regions of Andalusia and Extremadura, yields in the Ebro Delta are more consistent, due to a stable water supply.

Since 1992, the Ebro Delta is one of three Spanish regions awarded a Protected Designation of Origin for rice production. "The designation includes six varieties: bahía, bomba, fonsa, montsianell, sènia and tebre, grown exclusively in the towns of Aldea, Ampolla, Amposta, Camarles, Deltebre, Sant Carles de la Ràpita and Sant Jaume d'Enveja."

A network of canals and irrigation ditches constructed by both agricultural and conservation groups are helping to maintain the ecologic and economic resources of the Ebro Delta. The zebra mussel, an invasive species, is expanding through the delta and upstream in Ebro waters. Due to its rapid rate of reproduction with a competing advantage, the zebra mussel is adversely affecting native species.

Wildlife
In 1983 Spain designated a large part of the delta as a natural park. The natural park has protected wetlands, beaches, marshes, salt pans, and estuaries that provide extensive habitats.

The park is of international importance for eight of its plant species and 69 of its vertebrate fauna. It has some 95 breeding species of birds, is also very important for over 300 species of a wide range of transient and overwintering species, and serves as an essential stopover point for large numbers of migratory birds and waterfowl. The Ebro delta has the world's largest colony of Audouin's gulls.  In 2006 it held a record number of more than 15,000 pairs.

See also
Salt wedge, an estuary issue
List of rivers of Spain
Bomba rice — also with D.O. status for rice 
Calasparra — also with D.O. status for rice

References

Ebro in the Columbia Encyclopedia

External links 

Parc Natural del Delta de l'Ebre 
"Google Translate" version: Ebro Delta Natural Park
Earth from Space: The Ebro Delta. — seen from Space
Iberian Nature: The River Ebro and Delta
Birding in Spain: Photo gallery of the Ebro Delta and surrounding area - birds, plants, and landscapes.
Places to stay in Riumar, next to nature reserve in the Delta del Ebro - nature reserve, stayover, holiday homes.
The Trinidad Salt Pans - Pans within the Ebro River Delta Nature Reserve
Generalitat de Catalunya: Parcs Naturals, Delta de l'Ebre — official park homepage 

.01
Estuaries of Spain
Wetlands of Catalonia
Natural parks of Catalonia
Landforms of Catalonia
Landforms of Spain
River deltas of Europe
Province of Tarragona
Ramsar sites in Spain